At the 1992 Summer Olympics in Barcelona, four diving events were contested during a competition that took place at the Piscina Municipal de Montjuïc, from 26 July to 4 August ( 30–31 July, rest days), comprising 100 divers from 31 nations.

Medal summary
The events are named according to the International Olympic Committee labelling, but they appeared on the official report as "springboard diving" and "platform diving", respectively.

Men

Women

Medal table

Participating nations
Here are listed the nations that were represented in the diving events and, in brackets, the number of national competitors.

See also
 Diving at the 1991 Pan American Games
 Diving at the 1994 Commonwealth Games

Notes

References
 
 

 
1992 Summer Olympics events
1992
1992 in water sports